Haji Khel is a Pashtun clan of Chamkannis. They are a tribe or sub-caste of Noorzai, Haroonzai, Tareen settled in Tora Shah, Pishin, Balochistan, Pakistan.

Hajikhel are culturally and linguistically Pashtuns and they are known as "Khannan" by other Pashtun tribes which means "ruler" and that is why most of them use sur-name of "Khan's".

References

Social groups of Pakistan